Flitzer was a steel roller coaster  on the Surfside Pier in the amusement park Morey's Piers. The Flitzer was 1 of the 3 small coasters at Morey's Piers. It opened in 1983 and was manufactured by Zierer in 1969. In 2018, it was announced that the Flitzer would close for good after September 23, 2018. Due to weather, the send off for the ride was postponed to September 30, 2018. A roller coaster called Runaway Tram replaced the Flitzer in 2019. Three of the Flitzer's ride vehicles are now at Runaway Tram's entrance.

Refurbishments

In the 2004-2005 winter the Flitzer was taken down to be refurbished. They also changed the theme of the ride from space themed to surf themed. The ride was also moved when the RC-48 was removed from the pier. The Doo Wopper and the Flitzer was put in place of the RC-48.

Other Flitzer coasters
Among several other installations of the Flitzer roller coaster, two existed at Playland's Castaway Cove in Ocean City and Jenkinson's Boardwalk in Point Pleasant Beach. Playland's Flitzer was initially sold to Deggeller Attractions but was later scrapped, and Jenkinson's Flitzer has been relocated to Jolly Roger Amusement Park in Ocean City, Maryland under the name Barracuda. As of 2021, the only other permanent Flitzer model left in operation (in addition to Barracuda) worldwide is Speed Track at Rand Show in Johannesburg, South Africa. Other surviving Flitzer models also operate in traveling fairs, including Racing and Indy Racer Coaster (Reithoffer Shows).

References

Morey's Piers
Former roller coasters in New Jersey